Edwin Vurens (born 6 June 1968) is a Dutch football manager who coaches Dutch amateur side Docos. Vurens is a former international player who played professionally as a striker for clubs in the Netherlands and Switzerland.

Football career

Playing
Born in Stompwijk, Vurens played amateur football with Stompwijkse Boys and RKAVV, before signing a professional contract with Sparta Rotterdam. Vurens later played for FC Twente and Roda JC, before playing in Switzerland for FC St. Gallen and Servette FC. 

Vurens made one international appearance for the Netherlands national football team in 1995.

Coaching 
After retiring as a player in 2002, Vurens has coached a number of Dutch amateur sides including FC Zoetermeer, VUC Den Haag and BVCB. Since 2022, he manages the Leiden-side RKSV Docos.

References

External links
  Profile at Voetbal International
 
  Profile at Weltfußball.de

1968 births
Living people
People from Leidschendam
Association football forwards
Dutch footballers
Dutch football managers
Netherlands international footballers
Dutch expatriate footballers
Sparta Rotterdam players
Roda JC Kerkrade players
FC Twente players
FC St. Gallen players
Servette FC players
Eredivisie players
Swiss Super League players
Dutch expatriate sportspeople in Switzerland
Expatriate footballers in Switzerland
Footballers from South Holland